Aleksei Sergeyevich Sutormin (born 10 January 1994) is a Russian professional footballer who plays as a midfielder for Zenit St. Petersburg. He has also been successfully used as a right-back.

Club career
He made his debut in the Russian Second Division for FC Strogino Moscow on 15 July 2013 in a game against FC Torpedo Vladimir.

On 29 June 2019, he signed a 4-year contract with FC Rubin Kazan. Just 9 days later on 8 July 2019, after playing in 2 friendlies for Rubin, he moved again, signing a 3-year contract with 1-year extension option with Russian champion FC Zenit Saint Petersburg. On 21 September 2019, he scored a brace against his former club FC Rubin Kazan in the Russian Premier League.

On 7 April 2022, Sutormin signed a new contract with Zenit through the 2024–25 season.

International career
He was called up to the Russia national football team for the first time for World Cup qualifiers against Croatia, Cyprus and Malta in September 2021. He made his debut on 8 October 2021 against Slovakia. In his second game three days later against Slovenia, he was chosen as team captain. In his next game against Cyprus on 11 November 2021, he scored his first goal for the national team.

Honours
Zenit Saint Petersburg
 Russian Premier League: 2019–20, 2020–21, 2021–22
 Russian Cup: 2019–20
 Russian Super Cup: 2022

Career statistics

International goals 
Scores and results list Russia's goal tally first.

References

External links
 
 

1994 births
Footballers from Moscow
Living people
Russian footballers
Association football midfielders
Russia under-21 international footballers
Russia international footballers
FC Volgar Astrakhan players
FC Orenburg players
FC Rubin Kazan players
FC Zenit Saint Petersburg players
Russian Premier League players
Russian First League players
Russian Second League players
FC Strogino Moscow players